John B. Joseph (September 1, 1923 – September 1, 2020) was an Assyrian-American educator and historian of Middle Eastern studies. He taught courses on the history of the Middle East and its relationship with the West at Franklin & Marshall College (F&M) in Lancaster, Pennsylvania, from 1961 to 1988.

Joseph was born in Iraq in September 1923. He was the son of refugees from the Assyrian genocide in pre-Iran Persia, John B. (Benjamin) Joseph attended the American School for Boys in Baghdad. Pennsylvania missionary Calvin Staudt founded the school with his wife Ida. He occasionally sent students to his alma mater, F&M. Joseph arrived in 1946, received his degree from F&M in 1950, and subsequently earned a Ph.D from Princeton University. In his long teaching career at F&M, he inspired many students, including business executive Andrew Schindler, class of 1972, who contributed the leading sum for the construction of the "John Joseph International Center" at F&M, dedicated to the study of the world's languages, culture, history and politics. Following his retirement from full-time teaching, Joseph has held the title of Lewis Audenreid Professor Emeritus of History.

He died in Lancaster, Pennsylvania on his 97th birthday in September 2020.

Bibliography

Notes

External links
 Franklin & Marshall College: John Joseph International Center
 Sargon R. Michael (2002): Opinion & Reflections on Prof. John Joseph's Latest Book
 Fred Aprim (2002): Personal Reflections on John Joseph's Hypothesis
 Fred Aprim (2004): Prof. John Joseph: Selective or Objective
 Johny Messo (2004): The Professor & the Nationalist
 George V. Yana (2008): Ancient and Modern Assyrians: A Scientific Analysis
 Julia Ferrante (2013): A Chance for Life - Former prisoners of war launched new beginnings at F&M after World War II
 Arameans of Aram-Naharaim Organisation: Professor John Joseph (Yuhannon Yusef)

1923 births
2020 deaths
21st-century American historians
21st-century American male writers
American people of Iraqi-Assyrian descent
Historians from Pennsylvania
Historians of the Middle East
Iraqi emigrants to the United States
Middle Eastern studies scholars
Princeton University alumni
Writers from Baghdad
Writers from Lancaster, Pennsylvania
American male non-fiction writers